Cercidospora thamnoliicola is a species of lichenicolous fungus in the genus Cercidospora but it has not been assigned to a family. It is known to parasitise the lichen Thamnolia vermicularis in Iceland but it is rare there. The species was first formally described by mycologist Per G. Ihlen in 1995, from specimens growing on Thamnolia vermicularis in Norway.

References

Dothideomycetes
Fungi described in 1995
Fungi of Europe
Fungi of Iceland
Lichenicolous fungi